This is a list of cricketers who have played for Norfolk County Cricket Club in List A matches. Norfolk, one of the Minor Counties, played 26 List A cricket matches – a one-day, limited overs form of cricket – between 1965 and 2003. After making their List A debut in the 1965 Gillette Cup the county played four matches in the competition up to the 1970. Minor counties were not a regular feature of the competition until the 1982 NatWest Trophy after which Norfolk took part every year until the 1985 competition and then from 1990 until 2004, the last year in which all Minor Counties were included.

The knock-out nature of the Gillette Cup means that in most competitions Norfolk only played one match, generally against a first-class county. The exceptions were in 2000 and 2002 when Norfolk won their opening round match on each occasion and, in 2002, advanced to the third round of the competition after winning two matches. From the 2002 competition onwards the opening rounds of the tournament were held during the previous English cricket season. As a result, Norfolk's last List A match, in the 2004 Cheltenham & Gloucester Trophy, actually took place in August 2003.

Players are listed alphabetically with the number of matches played and the calendar years in which they made their first and last appearances in List A cricket for Norfolk. Most players also made appearances for Norfolk in the Minor Counties Championship. Some will have represented other sides in top-class cricket. Only their appearances for Norfolk are included below.

A
Nick Adams, 1 match, 1997
Andrew Agar, 2 matches, 1983–1984
Terry Allcock, 2 matches, 1965–1968
Carl Amos, 13 matches, 1994–2003

B

C

D
Pierre de Bruyn, 1 match, 2003
Stephen Dixon, 3 matches, 1990–1993
James Donaldson, 2 matches, 1968–1969

E
Bill Edrich, 4 matches, 1965–1970
Mark Ellis, 2 matches, 1990–1991

F
Richard Farrow, 2 matches, 1992–1993
Roger Finney, 5 matches, 1990–1994
Neil Foster, 1 match, 1995
Neil Fox, 8 matches, 1993–2000
Peter Free, 4 matches, 2000–2001

G
James Garner, 6 matches, 2000–2002
Steven Goldsmith, 15 matches, 1993–2003
John Greatrex, 1 match, 1970

H

I
Richard Innes, 1 match, 1983

J
Richard Jefferson, 3 matches, 1968–1970

K
Raymond Kingshott, 3 matches, 1990–1992

L
Jimmy Lewis, 2 matches, 1990–1992
Stephen Livermore, 7 matches, 1992–2002
Nigel Llong, 2 matches, 2000

M

N
Paul Newman, 12 matches, 1996–2003

P
Michael Parlane, 2 matches, 2002
David Pilch, 4 matches, 1965–1983
Steve Plumb, 10 matches, 1982–1995
Mark Powell, 2 matches, 1995–1996

R
Philip Ringwood, 1 match, 1983
Carl Rogers, 17 matches, 1991–2003
Billy Rose, 2 matches, 1965–1970
Claude Rutter, 1 match, 1965

S

T

W

References

Norfolk County Cricket Club
Norfolk